The Gaves réunis is a 9.4 km river in southwestern France connecting Peyrehorade to the Adour at Bec du Gave. It is formed by the confluence of the Gave de Pau and the Gave d'Oloron. It is navigable for 8 km from the confluence with the Adour until the town Peyrehorade.

See also
 List of rivers of France

References

 
Rivers of France
Rivers of Nouvelle-Aquitaine
Rivers of Landes (department)